The 2010–11 season will be MTK Budapest FC's 102nd competitive season, 16th consecutive season in the Nemzeti Bajnokság I and 122nd year in existence as a football club.

Team kit and logo
The team kits for the 2010–11 season are produced by Jako and the shirt sponsor is Fotex. The home kit is purple and white colour and the away kit is white colour.

Transfers

Summer

In:

Out:

Winter

In:

Out:

Club

Coaching staff

Top scorers
Includes all competitive matches. The list is sorted by shirt number when total goals are equal.

Last updated on 21 May 2011

Disciplinary record
Includes all competitive matches. Players with 1 card or more included only.

Last updated on 21 May 2011

Clean sheets
Last updated on 21 May 2011

References

External links
 Eufo
 Official Website
 UEFA
 fixtures and results

2010-11
Hungarian football clubs 2010–11 season